Pterotaenia angustifasciata is a species of ulidiid or picture-winged fly in the genus Pterotaenia of the family Ulidiidae.

Distribution
Argentina

References

Ulidiidae
Diptera of South America
Endemic fauna of Argentina
Taxa named by John Russell Malloch
Insects described in 1933